Leroy Jenkins (February 19, 1934 – June 21, 2017) was an American televangelist and preacher who was popular in the 1960s and 1970s. He was known for his faith healing, through the use of "miracle water". His television program can be seen on stations across the U.S. and internationally on Christian television networks.  Jenkins's mother, W. M. Jenkins, was also an evangelist in Florida during the 1960s and 1970s.

Career
Jenkins was known for his faith healing, through the use of "miracle water". In 2003, while based in Delaware, Ohio, Jenkins' "miracle water", drawn from a well on the grounds of his  religious compound known as the Healing Waters Cathedral, was found to contain coliform bacteria by the Ohio Department of Agriculture. Jenkins claimed tests conducted by independent laboratories all found the water safe for drinking and that the state ignored his findings. Jenkins was later fined $200 because he didn't have a license to sell the water.

In 1979, Jenkins was convicted in Greenwood, South Carolina, of conspiracy to assault two men and of plotting the arson of two homes. Jenkins was sentenced to 20 years in prison, with eight years suspended, for the incident. In 1994, he was arrested for grand theft, but the charges were soon dropped when he agreed to pay restitution. In 2001, his marriage to a 77-year-old widow, a black woman who had recently hit the Ohio Lottery jackpot for $6,000,000, was annulled by a judge in Delaware, Ohio. The legal guardian of Eloise Thomas, whose husband had died just three weeks before the marriage to Jenkins, former Ohio state senator Ben Espy, claimed on behalf of the woman's family that Thomas was incompetent and therefore incapable of knowing what she was doing when she attempted to marry Jenkins. Jenkins has repeatedly denied accusations that he was attempting to marry the woman for the sake of her net worth, which was estimated at $4,000,000.

In 2002, a film was released about his life, entitled The Calling (released on video as Man of Faith).

As of March 2011, Jenkins's ministry was based in Scottsdale, Arizona.

Jenkins released several Gospel albums over the course of his ministry career.

Jenkins died from complications of pneumonia on June 21, 2017.

Discography
God Gave Me A Song
If I Could Dream
Mercy Wins
Release Me
Songs and Sermon In Bakersfield
Songs To Be Healed By
Stars In My Crown
Touching Jesus

In film
 The Calling - 2002.

See also
Glossolalia
Pentecostalism
Word of Faith
Holy Spirit

References

External links
The official website of Leroy Jenkins
IMDB profile for  The Calling, a biopic about Leroy Jenkins
Announcement about release of The Calling
Phoenix News Times Article on Reverend Jenkins
Exposed by Inside Edition

1934 births
2017 deaths
American evangelists
American television evangelists
People from Greenwood, South Carolina
American television personalities